Ondrašovce is a village and municipality in the Prešov District of the Prešov Region of eastern Slovakia.

History
In the historical records, the village was first mentioned in 1427.

Geography
The municipality lies at an altitude of 460 metres and covers an area of 4.356 km². It has a population of about 65 people.

Villages and municipalities in Prešov District
Šariš